Firuzabad-e Tappeh (also Romanized as Fīrūzābād-e Tappeh, and Fīrūzābād Tappeh; also known as Fīrūzābād and Fīrūzābād-e Bozorg) is a village in Kermajan Rural District, in the Central District of Kangavar County, Kermanshah Province, Iran. At the 2006 census, its population was 364, in 72 families.

References 

Populated places in Kangavar County